Mybster is a small village, in Caithness, Scottish Highlands, and is in the Scottish council area of Highland.

Mybster is at one end of the Wester Pipe Railway.

References 

Populated places in Caithness